The 1902 Alabama Crimson White football team (variously "Alabama", "UA" or "Bama") represented the University of Alabama in the 1902 college football season. The team was led by head coach Eli Abbott, in his only season of his second stint (fourth season overall), and played their home games at The Quad in Tuscaloosa and at West End Park in Birmingham, Alabama. James O. Heyworth served as a co-head coach with Abbott for the season. In what was the tenth season of Alabama football, the team finished with a record of four wins and four losses (4–4, 2–4 SIAA).

Schedule

Scoring note:

Game summaries

Birmingham High School
Alabama opened the 1902 season with a 57–0 victory over Birmingham High School in Tuscaloosa. The victory brought Alabama's all-time record against Birmingham High School to 2–0.

Marion Military Institute
Against the Marion Military Institute, Alabama scored the most offensive points in the young history of the program with their 81–0 victory. In the game touchdowns were scored by Frederick Grist Stickney and W. H. Arrington (with three each); Frank Montague Lett, William Swift Sherrill and James Forman (with two each); and R. L. Lodge, H. M. Smith and Gessner T. McCorvery (with one each).

Auburn

Against the Alabama Polytechnic Institute (now known as Auburn University) Alabama was defeated 23–0 at West End Park in Birmingham. Auburn took an 11–0 lead in the first half on a one-yard H. A. Allison touchdown run and a ten-yard Bill Patterson touchdown run. Auburn then scored their final points of the game on a pair of Allison touchdown runs of 75 and two yards for the 23–0 victory. The loss brought Alabama's all-time record against Auburn to 1–6.

Georgia

Against the University of Georgia, Alabama was shut out for the second consecutive game with their 5–0 loss at Birmingham. Marvin M. Dickinson scored the only touchdown of the game for Georgia in the second half. Alabama was trying to tie up the game late, but time expired as the Tide reached the Georgia twelve-yard line. The loss brought Alabama's all-time record against Georgia to 0–2–1.

Mississippi A&M

After consecutive losses, Alabama defeated the Aggies of Mississippi A&M (now known as Mississippi State University) 27–0 on The Quad. Alabama scored touchdowns in the first half on runs by Frederick Grist Stickney, 45-yards by Auxford Burks and 30-yards by James Forman. In the second half, touchdowns were scored on runs of 20-yards from Burks and a Stickney run. The victory brought Alabama's all-time record against Mississippi A&M (Mississippi State) to 3–0.

Texas

In the first all-time meeting against the University of Texas, Alabama lost 10–0 on The Quad. In a game dominated by both defenses early, Texas scored their first touchdown with only 0:13 remaining in the first half on a ten-yard John A. Jackson. He then scored the only other touchdown in the second half for the 10–0 Longhorn victory.

Georgia Tech

In the first all-time meeting against Georgia Tech, Alabama won 26–0 at Birmingham. Alabama took a 5–0 halftime lead after James Forman scored the only points of the first half on a seven-yard touchdown run. Alabama then scored four second half touchdown from Forman, Frederick Grist Stickney and two by Auxford Burks for the 26–0 victory.

LSU

Alabama closed the 1902 season two days after their victory over Georgia Tech with an 11–0 loss against LSU at Tuscaloosa. Henry Landry scored both touchdowns for LSU in the victory. The loss brought Alabama's all-time record against LSU to 0–2.

Players
Guards
 W. H. Arrington
 Harmon Burns
 J. C. Fortune
 J. C. Granade
 Frank Montague Lett

Tackles
 R. L. Daniel
 James Forman
 H. H. Jones

Center
 James C. Gwin

Ends
 R. L. Lodge
 John Roberts Peavy
 W. S. Sherrill

Backs
 Auxford Burks
 G. M. Edwards
 Gessner T. McCorvery
 W. McMahon
 H. M. Smith
 Frederick Grist Stickney
 W. S. Wyatt
 Cecil Hugh Young

Source:

Notes

References

Alabama
Alabama Crimson Tide football seasons
Alabama Crimson White football